Armin Mahović (born November 28, 1991) is a Bosnian footballer who plays for Austrian Regionalliga club SK Bischofshofen.

Club career 
Mahović began his career in 2008 in the First League of Bosnia and Herzegovina with Olimpic Sarajevo. The following season he was transferred to play in the Premier League of Bosnia and Herzegovina with NK Zeljeznicar. After a season with Zeljeznicar he returned to the First League of Bosnia and Herzegovina to play with FK Famos Hrasnica. Throughout his time in the First League of Bosnia and Herzegovina he played with NK Bratstvo Gračanica, FK Goražde, HNK Čapljina, and FK Rudar Kakanj. In 2014, he returned to the Premier League of Bosnia and Herzegovina to play with NK Travnik, and later with FK Goražde.

In 2015, he played abroad in the Canadian Soccer League with Brantford Galaxy. After a season abroad he returned to Olimpic Sarajevo, and played in the Premier League of Bosnia and Herzegovina. In 2017, he played with Borac Banja Luka.

References 

1991 births
Living people
Footballers from Sarajevo
Association football forwards
Bosnia and Herzegovina footballers
FK Olimpik players
FK Željezničar Sarajevo players
FK Famos Hrasnica players
NK Bratstvo Gračanica players
FK Goražde players
HNK Čapljina players
FK Rudar Kakanj players
NK Travnik players
Brantford Galaxy players
FK Borac Banja Luka players
First League of the Federation of Bosnia and Herzegovina players
Premier League of Bosnia and Herzegovina players
Canadian Soccer League (1998–present) players
Austrian Regionalliga players
Bosnia and Herzegovina expatriate footballers
Expatriate soccer players in Canada
Bosnia and Herzegovina expatriate sportspeople in Canada
Expatriate footballers in Austria
Bosnia and Herzegovina expatriate sportspeople in Austria